Camillo Bertarelli (10 March 1886 in Capaccio – 27 November 1982 in Milan) was an Italian racing cyclist.

Major results
1911
2nd Piccolo Giro di Lombardia
1913
7th Milan–San Remo
8th Tour de France
14th Giro d'Italia
1916
2nd Giro di Lombardia
1920
3rd Tre Valli Varesine

References

1886 births
1982 deaths
Italian male cyclists
Sportspeople from the Province of Salerno
Cyclists from Campania